The prix Jacques Chardonne was created in 1986 to reward a French-language work, whether a chronicle, an essay, a newspaper, a story, a short story or a novel. The quality of style and freedom of mind were major characteristics in order to be awarded. The price was set at 50,000 francs. The award has not been awarded since 1997.

List of laureates 
 1986: Gilles Pudlowski for L'Amour du Pays (Flammarion)
 1987: Georges Borgeaud for Le Soleil sur Aubiac
 1988: Pierre Veilletet for Mari-Barbola (Arléa)
 1990: Denis Tillinac for Le Corrèze et le Zambèze (Robert Laffont)
 1991: Louis Nucéra for Le Ruban rouge (Grasset)
 1993: Amélie Nothomb for Le Sabotage amoureux (Albin Michel)
 1996: Diane de Margerie for Dans la spirale (Éditions Gallimard)

See also 
 Jacques Chardonne

External links 
 Book awards: Prix Jacques Chardonne on LibraryThing
 Prix Jacques-Chardonne Winners on Goodreads

Jacques Chardonne
Awards established in 1986
1986 establishments in France